Orthops is a genus of plant bugs in the family Miridae. There are at least 30 described species in Orthops.

Species
These 35 species belong to the genus Orthops:

 Orthops abessinicus (Reuter, 1903) c g
 Orthops acaciae (Lindberg, 1958) c g
 Orthops alpicola (Poppius, 1910) c g
 Orthops basalis (A. Costa, 1853) c g
 Orthops brevicornis (Linnavuori, 1973) c g
 Orthops campestris (Linnaeus, 1758) c g
 Orthops daidalos Linnavuori, 1974 c g
 Orthops ferrugineus (Reuter, 1906) c g
 Orthops forelii Fieber, 1858 c g
 Orthops ghaurii Zheng, 2004 c g
 Orthops kalmii (Fieber, 1858) i c g
 Orthops lavandulae (Lindberg, 1958) c g
 Orthops lugubris (Poppius, 1914) c g
 Orthops meruensis (Poppius, 1910) c g
 Orthops modestus (Linnavuori, 1973) c g
 Orthops montanus (Schilling, 1837) c g
 Orthops mutabilis (Buchanan-White, 1878) c g
 Orthops mutans (Stal, 1858) c g
 Orthops nigriscutum (Poppius, 1912) c g
 Orthops nigropunctatus (Poppius, 1912) c g
 Orthops palus (T. Taylor, 1947) c g
 Orthops pilosulus Jakovlev, 1877 c g
 Orthops podocarpi Linnavuori, 1975 c g
 Orthops polydeukes Linnavuori, 1974 c g
 Orthops qualis (Distant, 1909) c g
 Orthops sangvinolentus (Reuter, 1879) c g
 Orthops santaluciae (Lindberg, 1958) c g
 Orthops scutellatus Uhler, 1877 i c g b (carrot plant bug)
 Orthops sjostedti (Poppius, 1910) c g
 Orthops suturellus (Poppius, 1910) c
 Orthops tessulatus Linnavuori, 1975 c g
 Orthops unguicularis (Linnavuori, 1973) c g
 Orthops versicoloreus Linnavuori, 1975 c g
 Orthops v-flavum (Reuter, 1907) c g
 Orthops vitticeps (Reuter, 1906) c g

Data sources: i = ITIS, c = Catalogue of Life, g = GBIF, b = Bugguide.net

References

Further reading

External links

 

Miridae genera
Mirini